The UMass Lowell River Hawks baseball team represents University of Massachusetts Lowell, which is located in Lowell, Massachusetts. The River Hawks are an NCAA Division I college baseball program that competes in the America East Conference. They began competing in Division I in 2014 and joined the America East Conference the same season.

The UMass Lowell River Hawks play all home games at Edward A. LeLacheur Park. Over their two seasons of postseason eligibility in the America East Conference, the River Hawks have played in two America East Tournaments, advancing to the semifinals in 2018.

Since the program's inception in 1976, five River Hawks have gone on to play in Major League Baseball, highlighted by 1987 Gold Glove catcher Mike LaValliere. Over the program's 35 seasons, 22 River Hawks have been drafted, including Jack Leathersich who was selected in the fifth round of the 2011 Major League Baseball draft.

Conference membership history (Division I only) 
2014–present: America East Conference

Edward A. LeLacheur Park 

Edward A. LeLacheur Park is a baseball stadium on the UMass Lowell campus in Lowell, Massachusetts that seats 4,842 people. It opened in 1998. It also the home of the Lowell Spinners, the former Class-A affiliate of the Boston Red Sox.

Head coaches (Division I only) 
Records taken from the 2020 UMass Lowell baseball record book.

Awards and honors (Division I only)

 Over their 7 seasons in the Atlantic Sun Conference, 8 different River Hawks have been named to the all-conference first-team.

Freshman First-Team All-Americans

America East Conference First-Team All-Conference

Taken from the 2020 UMass Lowell baseball record book. Updated March 16, 2020.

River Hawks in the Major Leagues

Taken from the 2020 UMass Lowell baseball record book. Updated March 16, 2020.

See also
List of NCAA Division I baseball programs

References